The 1935–36 season was the 13th season in the existence of Hércules CF, the Spanish football team based in Alicante, in the autonomous community of Valencia.  It was its first year in the Primera División.

First-team squad

Transfers

In

Out

Statistics

Appearances and goals

Source: bdfutbol.com (for appearances) and games chronicles of the archive of El Mundo Deportivo (for La Liga goals and for Copa appearances and goals)

Key
# = Squad number
P = Playing position
N = Nation
GS = Game started in Liga
Liga = Number of games played in Liga
G = Number of goals scored in Liga
Cup = Number of games played in Copa del Rey
G = Number of goals scored in Copa del Rey

Starting XI
(These are the most used starting players in the most used formation throughout the complete season).

Match results

Primera División

Copa del Rey

References

External links
Hércules CF – official site
Hércules 1935-36 Stats – bdfutbol.com

Spanish football clubs 1935–36 season
1935-36